John Elson Mkangala (born 25 December 1962) is a Malawian lightweight boxer. He competed at the 1988 Summer Olympics, where he finished in seventeenth place.

References

1962 births
Living people
Malawian male boxers
Olympic boxers of Malawi
Boxers at the 1988 Summer Olympics
Commonwealth Games competitors for Malawi
Boxers at the 1986 Commonwealth Games
Boxers at the 1990 Commonwealth Games

Lightweight boxers